Cyclone Arthur (RSMC Nadi designation: 08F, JTWC designation: 09P) was the eighth tropical depression and fourth tropical cyclone of the 2006–07 South Pacific cyclone season. Forming as tropical depression on January 25, Arthur rapidly intensified into a strong Category 2 cyclone on the Australian intensity scale according to the Regional Specialized Meteorological Centre in Nadi, Fiji. The Joint Typhoon Warning Center assessed the storm to have peaked as a minimal category 1 cyclone. Shortly after peaking in intensity, the cyclone began to weaken due to unfavorable conditions. Quickly moving towards the east-southeast, the Arthur began to undergo an extratropical transition. After turning towards the southeast, the center of circulation was almost fully exposed due to strong wind shear. However, Arthur briefly re-strengthened late on January 26 before becoming extratropical the next day. Tropical Cyclone Arthur affected several small islands during its existence. French Polynesia observed the most noteworthy effects from the storm, where several landslides damaged a few homes.

Meteorological history

The depression slowly traveled towards the east-southeast for several days as the overall structure of the storm fluctuated due to diurnal variations and strong wind shear. Around 1700 UTC on January 22, the Joint Typhoon Warning Center (JTWC) issued a Tropical Cyclone Formation Alert for the depression. The system developed a large banding feature in the northern portion of the circulation and deep convection formed around the center of circulation. The depression had moved into an area of weak to moderate wind shear with favorable diffulence aloft. Later that day, gale warnings were issued for the northeastern quadrant of the system. Tropical Depression 08F continued to develop as an anticyclone developed above the system, enhancing the environment around it. A mid-latitude trough located north of the depression was steering it towards the east.

Early on January 24, the system became better organized and strengthened into a cyclone at 0600 UTC. The storm, which was named Arthur by the FMS, began to undergo rapid intensification as the structure improved significantly. Deep convection developed around the center with strong outflow towards the north. Several hours after becoming a cyclone, the JTWC issued their first advisory on Tropical Cyclone 09P as it traveled quickly towards the east-southeast. The quick movement was due to the influences of subtropical ridge to the north and a trough to the south. Later that day, a banding eye feature began to develop as the storm intensified into a Category 2 cyclone on the Australian intensity scale. At 1800 UTC, the JTWC assessed Arthur to have reached its peak intensity with winds of  1-minute winds), the equivalent of a minimal Category 1 hurricane on the Saffir–Simpson scale. Shortly after peaking in intensity, Arthur began to undergo an extratropical transition and rapidly deteriorated due to strong wind shear.

The storm also began to merge with a low-level frontal boundary associated with the remnants of Tropical Cyclone Zita. The strong shear left the center of circulation partially exposed, with deep convection persisting in only the southeastern quadrant. In addition to the shear, dry air began to enter the system, causing it to weaken further. While continuing to move at a quick pace, the storm began to turn towards the southeast along a baroclinic zone. Early on January 26, the JTWC issued their final advisory on the cyclone as it lost most of its tropical characteristics. Arthur re-intensified shortly after and the JTWC reissued advisories on the storm around 2100 UTC. The brief re-strengthening was the result of a breakdown in the baroclinic zone which allowed convection to redevelop around the center. Around the same time, Arthur left the FMS's area of responsibility (AoR) and entered the New Zealand's MetService's AoR. The storm completed its extratropical transition around 1200 UTC on January 27, leading to the final advisory being issued on the storm.

Preparations and impact
On January 21, a gale watch was issued for Tutuila, American Samoa, Manu'a, and Swains Island as Tropical Depression 08F approached the islands. Small craft advisories were issued for the Cook Islands due to large swells produced by the storm. All of the watches were cancelled late on January 23 as the depression was no longer forecast to impact the islands. On January 24, an Orange Alert was issued for the Austral Islands. As the storm neared the region, the alert was upgraded to a Red Alert for Rurutu and Tubuai. Arthur produced minor damages in the Cook Islands—primarily consisting of beach erosion—on January 24. Heavy rains throughout French Polynesia resulted in several landslides which damaged several homes on Tahiti and Moorea. Several homes were damaged and roads were blocked by fallen trees throughout the island. Minor coastal flooding also occurred due to the large swells.

See also

 2006–07 South Pacific cyclone season

References

External links

Category 2 South Pacific cyclones
Tropical cyclones in the Cook Islands
Tropical cyclones in French Polynesia
2007 in the Cook Islands
2007 in French Polynesia
Tropical cyclones in 2007